Shin Jae-min (born 29 September 1958) is a South Korean bureaucrat. He was the former Vice Minister of Ministry of Culture, Sports and Tourism.

Criticism

Controversial comments
He made a controversial statement of mentioning that the President of South Korea has a legal rights to fire the top executive of the Korean Broadcasting System on 5 July  2008.

Corruption charges in 2010
Shin was the subject of the confirmation hearing around late August 2010 for his actions of illegally speculating in real estate, money-laundering, registering over phony resident address; earning his nickname "corruption department store".

Corruption charges in 2011
On November 28, 2011, the Seoul Central District Prosecutor's Office arrested Shin for bribery charges from a lobbying incident that involved Lee Kuk-chul, chairman of the shipbuilding company, SLS Group.

References

External links
 Naver People

1958 births
Lee Myung-bak Government
People from South Chungcheong Province
South Korean journalists
Seoul National University alumni
Living people